Lekwa-Teemane Local Municipality is a local municipality in Dr Ruth Segomotsi Mompati District Municipality, North West Province, South Africa. The Seat of local municipality is Christiana.

Main places
The 2001 census divided the municipality into the following main places:

Politics 

The municipal council consists of fourteen members elected by mixed-member proportional representation. Seven are elected by first-past-the-post voting in seven wards, while the remaining seven are chosen from party lists so that the total number of party representatives is proportional to the number of votes received. In the election of 1 November 2021 the African National Congress (ANC) lost their outright majority on the council.

The following table shows the results of the 2021 election.

References

External links 
 Official site

Local municipalities of the Dr Ruth Segomotsi Mompati District Municipality